Dorseyville is a census-designated place (CDP) in Iberville Parish, Louisiana, United States, corresponding to the unincorporated community of Dorcyville or Dorseyville. Dorseyville was first listed as a CDP prior to the 2020 census with a population of 159.

It is in the southeastern part of the parish, on the southwest bank of the Mississippi River. Louisiana Highway 1  forms the southern edge of the community, leading southeast  to White Castle and northwest  to Plaquemine.

Demographics

Note: the US Census treats Hispanic/Latino as an ethnic category. This table excludes Latinos from the racial categories and assigns them to a separate category. Hispanics/Latinos can be of any race.

References 

Census-designated places in Iberville Parish, Louisiana
Census-designated places in Louisiana